Oğuz Sabankay  (born August 7, 1987, in Akhisar) is a Turkish footballer who plays as a midfielder for Kınık Belediyespor.

Club career

Galatasaray
Oğuz was signed from Akhisar B.G.S. in the summer of 2004 by Galatasaray for their youth team on the same day rivals Fenerbahçe signed Brazilian playmaker Alex. It was an interesting occurrence while one rival team signed an aging star playmaker for the present the other signed a young star playmaker for the future.

Oğuz made his professional debut on August 13, 2006, in a home game against Kayserispor coming on in the 84th minute for Saša Ilić. Galatasaray went on to win the game 4–0.

Vestel Manisaspor
On January 12, 2007, Oğuz signed for Vestel Manisaspor on a one and a half seasons long loan contract. This move was seen as a great opportunity for Oğuz to gain first team experience in a town close to his hometown of Akhisar. Ersun Yanal who was the Manisaspor coach at the time had worked with Arda Turan who was proving to be a revelation at Galatasaray that year, the previous season. Many expected similar feats from Oğuz. His time at Manisaspor was ridden with injuries and the fact that Manisaspor kept on changing their manager almost every 3 months did not help him gain a first team spot on the team either. He parted ways with the club once his contract ran out.

Eskişehirspor
Oguz signed a one season long loan contract with Eskişehirspor during the summer of 2008 or the 2008–2009 season. Even though Rıza Çalımbay had stated that Oğuz was a player he was excited over signing he did not give him a chance in a single match despite Oğuz impressing in the pre-season training camp over the summer as well as scoring a nice goal in a friendly match. The contract was mutually terminated in mid-season as Oğuz looked to gain first team experience elsewhere.

Istanbul Büyükşehir Belediyespor
After leaving Eskişehirspor. Oğuz signed a one and a half seasons long contract with Istanbul Büyükşehir Belediyespor in January 2009. At Istanbul Büyükşehir Belediyespor he teams up with his former manager at the Galatasaray youth team and the U-17 Turkish NT, Abdullah Avcı.

Kartalspor
Oğuz joined Kartalspor on loan with fellow Galatasaray youth products Semih Kaya and Erhan Şentürk to work under Galatasaray legend Ergün Penbe for the 2010–2011 season.

International career
He has represented the Turkish national team on several levels including 4 appearances for the U-21's. He has played 60 times for what is referred to as the A youth and 6 times for the B youth scoring on 3 occasions in total on both levels. His first ever national team goal was in a game against the Northern Ireland U-17's in a European championship qualifier match. The goal came in the 74th minute with the Turkish U-17's going on to win the game 5–2 in Northern Ireland.

References

External links

1987 births
Living people
People from Akhisar
Turkish footballers
Turkey under-21 international footballers
Süper Lig players
Galatasaray A2 footballers
Galatasaray S.K. footballers
Manisaspor footballers
Eskişehirspor footballers
İstanbul Başakşehir F.K. players
Bucaspor footballers
Turkey youth international footballers
Association football midfielders